Patti may refer to:

People
 Patti (name)
 Patti caste, a group of people

Places
 Patti, Iran (disambiguation)
 Patti, Punjab, India
 Patti, Punjab Assembly constituency, India
 Patti, Sicily
 Patti, Uttar Pradesh, India
 Patti, Uttar Pradesh Assembly constituency, India
 Mount Patti, Nigeria

Music
 Patti (album), a 1985 album by Patti LaBelle
 Sissieretta Jones, soprano and opera singer known as "The Black Patti"

See also
Pati (disambiguation)
Pattie (disambiguation)
Patty (disambiguation)